The NSW League Three Men is a defunct regional Australian semi-professional association football league comprising teams from New South Wales. The league was sits at Level 4 on the New South Wales league system (Level 5 of the overall Australian league system). The competition is administered by Football NSW, the governing body of the sport in the southern region of the state (the northern region governed by Northern NSW Football). At the conclusion of the 2019 season it was announced that the NSW State League would become the NPL NSW 4. and in 2022 seasons onwards, the league name change again from "National Premier League 4 NSW" to "Football NSW League Three".

History
The Men's former State League One competition originally sat on the fourth tier of the NSW football league structure and is the lowest division connected to the NPL NSW 1. The league generally consists of 12 teams competing in a round-robin structure where each side plays one another twice. The top four sides at the end of the regular season compete in the Championship Series.

In 2007 the competition was divided in two – New South Wales Conference League North and the New South Wales Conference League South – with this format only used for two years.

In 2009 the competition was combined, and called the New South Wales State League Division Two.

In 2013 when the FFA launched the National Premier Leagues, State League 2 was not rebranded under this banner; this was to ensure that the teams competing at this level did not have to fulfil the strict financial and club-based criteria that would have resulted in some smaller teams having to withdraw from the league.

In 2016, with the 3rd division (then State League 1) of NSW being incorporated into the National Premier Leagues (as NPL NSW 3), State League 2 became known as the NSW State League.

In 2019 a number of changes occurred. This included Wagga City Wanderers leaving the competition to join the newly formed Capital Football NPL 2 competition.

In 2020, the competition was rebranded under the NPL banner to NPL 4 with (generally) a 12 team format. In that year, however, Newcastle Jets Youth were temporarily promoted to the NPL2 mid-season due to the withdrawal of NPL2 team Mounties Wanderers.

In 2022, the competition was rebranded again from NPL 4 to NSW League Three Men with (generally) a 11 team format, Western NSW FC will no longer have a senior presence in the NSW league three, after the club announced the folding of its men's first grade, under 20s and under 18s teams ahead of the 2022 season.

Seasons

See also
 Football NSW
 Football (soccer) in New South Wales

Notes

References

External links
 Football NSW Website
 Football NSW League 3

Defunct soccer leagues in Australia
4
Sports leagues established in 1977
1977 establishments in Australia